Cryptoprocta spelea, also known as the giant fossa, is an extinct species of carnivore from Madagascar in the family Eupleridae which is most closely related to the mongooses and includes all Malagasy carnivorans. It was first described in 1902, and in 1935 was recognized as a separate species from its closest relative, the living fossa (Cryptoprocta ferox). C. spelea was larger than the fossa, but otherwise similar. The two have not always been accepted as distinct species. When and how C. spelea became extinct is unknown; there is some anecdotal evidence, including reports of very large fossas, that there is more than one surviving species.

The species is known from subfossil bones found in a variety of caves in northern, western, southern, and central Madagascar. In some sites, it occurs with remains of C. ferox, but there is no evidence that the two lived in the same places at the same time. Living species of comparably sized, related carnivores in other regions manage to coexist, suggesting that the same may have happened with both C. spelea and C. ferox.  C. spelea would have been able to prey on larger animals than its smaller relative could have, including the recently extinct giant lemurs.

Taxonomy
In 1902, Guillaume Grandidier described subfossil carnivoran remains from two caves on Madagascar as a larger "variety" of the living fossa (Cryptoprocta ferox), C. ferox var. spelea. G. Petit, writing in 1935, considered spelea to represent a distinct species. Charles Lamberton reviewed subfossil and living Cryptoprocta in 1939 and agreed with Petit in recognizing 2 species, naming this species from a specimen found  at Ankazoabo Cave near the place Itampolo. The generic name translates to "hidden anus" referring to the fact that the anus is hidden by anal sacs in C. ferox. The specific name spelea means "cave" and was given because of the location of its discovery. However, Lamberton apparently had at most three skeletons of the living fossa, not nearly enough to capture the range of variation in that species, and some later authors did not separate C. spelea and C. ferox as species. Steven Goodman and colleagues, using larger samples, compiled another set of Cryptoprocta measurements that was published in a 2004 article. They found that some subfossil Cryptoprocta fell outside the range of variation of living C. ferox, and identified those as representing C. spelea. Grandidier had not designated a type specimen for the species, and to maintain C. spelea as the name for the larger form of the fossa, Goodman and colleagues designated a specimen to serve as the type specimen (specifically, a neotype).

Lamberton recognized a third species, Cryptoprocta antamba, on the basis of a mandible (lower jaw) with abnormally broad spacing between the condyloid processes at the back. He also referred two femora (upper leg bones) and a tibia (lower leg bone) intermediate in size between C. spelea and C. ferox to this species. The specific name refers to the "antamba", an animal allegedly from southern Madagascar described by Étienne de Flacourt in 1658 as a large, rare, leopard-like carnivore that eats men and calves and lives in remote mountainous areas; it may have been the giant fossa. Goodman and colleagues could not locate Lamberton's material of Cryptoprocta antamba, but suggested that it was based on an abnormal C. spelea. Together, the fossa and C. spelea form the genus Cryptoprocta within the family Eupleridae, which also includes the other Malagasy carnivorans—the falanouc, the fanalokas, and the Galidiinae. DNA sequence studies suggest that the Eupleridae form a single natural (monophyletic) group and are most closely related to the mongooses of Eurasia and mainland Africa.

Description

Although some morphological differences between the two fossa species have been described, these may be allometric (growth-related), and in their 1986 Mammalian Species account of the fossa, Michael Köhncke and Klaus Leonhardt wrote that the two were morphologically identical. However, remains of C. spelea are larger than any living C. ferox. Goodman and colleagues found that spelea were 1.07 to 1.32 times as large as in adult C. ferox, and postcranial measurements were 1.19 to 1.37 times as large. The only specimen of C. spelea in which condylobasal length (a measure of total skull length) could be ascertained measured 153.4 mm (6.04 in), compared to a range of 114.5 to 133.3 mm (4.51 to 5.25 in) in adult C. ferox. Humerus (upper arm bone) length in twelve C. spelea is 122.7 to 146.8 mm (4.83 to 5.78 in), averaging 137.9 mm (5.43 in), compared to 108.5 to 127.5 mm (4.27 to 5.02 in), averaging 116.1 mm (4.57 in), in the extant fossa. Body mass estimates for C. spelea range from 17 kg (37 lb) to 20 kg (44 lb), and it was among the largest carnivores of the island.  By comparison, adult C. ferox range from 5 kg (11 lb) to 10 kg (22 lb).

Distribution and ecology

Subfossil remains of the giant fossa have been found in Holocene cave sites from the northern end of Madagascar along the west coast to the far south, and in the central highlands. Some sites have yielded both C. spelea and smaller remains referable to the living species, C. ferox; however, lack of robust stratigraphic knowledge and no available radiocarbon dating on subfossil Cryptoprocta bones makes it uncertain whether the two species lived in the same region at the same time. The size ratio between the two species is within the range of ratios seen between similar-sized living cats and mongooses found in the same areas, suggesting that the two species may have been able to occur together.

With its large size and massive jaws and teeth, C. spelea was a formidable, "puma-like" predator, and in addition to smaller prey it may have eaten some of the big, now extinct subfossil lemurs that would have been too large for C. ferox. No subfossil evidence has been found to definitively show that lemurs were its prey; this assumption is based on the diet of the smaller, extant species of fossa. Other possible prey include tenrecs, smaller euplerids, and even young Malagasy hippopotamuses.

Extinction
Why and when C. spelea went extinct is not known; it is possible that C. spelea went extinct before 1400.  C. spelea is on the IUCN Red List.

Local people on Madagascar often recognize two forms of fossa, a larger fosa mainty (or "black Cryptoprocta") and a smaller fosa mena (or "reddish Cryptoprocta"). There are also some anecdotal records of very large living fossas, such as a 2 m (7 ft), 30 kg (70 lb) fossa at Morondava. Goodman and colleagues suggested that further research may demonstrate that there is more than one species of fossa yet alive.

C. spelea is the only extinct carnivoran mammal known from Madagascar; recently extinct (non-carnivoran) Madagascan animals also include large lemurs, elephant birds, and Malagasy hippopotamuses.

The extinction of C. spelea may have changed predation dynamics on Madagascar.

References

Literature cited
 
 
 
 
 
 
 
 
 
 
 
 
 

Euplerids
Extinct carnivorans
Holocene extinctions
Prehistoric animals of Madagascar